The Nebnellis river (in French: rivière Nebnellis) is a tributary of the south-eastern shore of the Chaudière River which flows northward to empty onto the south shore of the St. Lawrence River.

Toponymy 
The toponym Rivière Nebnellis was formalized on December 5, 1968, at the Commission de toponymie du Québec.

See also 
 List of rivers of Quebec

References 

Rivers of Estrie
Le Granit Regional County Municipality